Maria Celeste is an impact crater on Venus named in honor of Maria Celeste, the daughter of Galileo Galilei.

References

Impact craters on Venus